Ioannis "Giannis" Dimakos (Greek: Ιωάννης "Γιάννης" Δημάκος; born September 14, 1990) is a Greek professional basketball player for Eleftheroupoli of the Greek 2nd Division. He is a 6 ft 4  in (1.94 m) tall shooting guard.

Professional career
After spending the 2008–09 season in the semi-pro Greek 3rd-tier level B League team, Ikaros Kallitheas, Dimakos started his pro career with Aigaleo, during the 2009–10 season, playing in the Greek 2nd Division. For the next two years, Dimakos played with Pagrati in the Greek 2nd Division.

In the 2011–12 season, he had a very good season in the Greek 2nd Division, averaging 16.0 points, 3.7 rebounds, 2.1 assists, and 1.1 steals per game. His performance with Pagrati, garnered interest from the top-tier level Greek League team Rethymno Aegean.

In 2012, he signed with the Greek 1st Division club Panelefsiniakos. In 2014, after two years playing with Panelefsiniakos in the Greek 1st Division, he signed with the Greek 2nd Division club Psychiko. In his first year with Psychiko (2014–15 Greek 2nd Division season), he was the Greek A2 League's Top Scorer, averaging 19.5 points per game. 
 
In 2015, he renewed his contract with Psychiko. On July 10, 2016, Dimakos signed with Faros Keratsiniou of the Greek A2 League. On June 7, 2017, Dimakos signed with Promitheas Patras of the top-tier level Greek Basket League, returning to the top league of the Greek Basket system after 3 years.

On July 19, 2018, Dimakos signed with Kolossos Rodou. On July 31, 2019, Dimakos returned to Athens and signed with newly promoted Ionikos Nikaias.

Awards and accomplishments
Greek Second Division: Top Scorer (2015)

References and notes

External links
FIBA Game Center Profile
Eurobasket.com Profile
Draftexpress.com Profile
Scoresway.us Profile
Greek Basket League Profile 

1990 births
Living people
Aigaleo B.C. players
Faros Keratsiniou B.C. players
Greek men's basketball players
Ionikos Nikaias B.C. players
Kolossos Rodou B.C. players
Pagrati B.C. players
Panelefsiniakos B.C. players
People from Corinthia
Promitheas Patras B.C. players
Psychiko B.C. players
Shooting guards
Sportspeople from the Peloponnese